Hammarö may mean:

Hammarö Municipality, a municipality of Värmland County in Sweden, located on Hammarön
Hammarön, an island in Lake Vänern where the municipality is situated